Souvenance is a jazz studio album by Tunisian oud player Anouar Brahem. This album was released in the label ECM Records in May 2014.

Composition
The album was written during the Arab Spring in Tunisia, Brahem says about this that "I had to wait for the pressure to fall, before I could resume work." and that "I don’t claim a direct link between my compositions and the events that have taken place in Tunisia [...] but I was deeply affected by them."

Track listing
ECM New Series – ECM 2423/24.

Personnel
 Anouar Brahem – oud
 François Couturier – piano
 Klaus Gesing – bass clarinet
 Björn Meyer – bass
 Orchestra della Svizzera Italiana - Pietro Mianiti

References

ECM Records albums
2015 albums
Albums produced by Manfred Eicher